Master Raindrop is an animated television program produced jointly by Australian, New Zealand and Singaporean companies that first screened on the Australian Seven Network from 15 March 2008 to 14 February 2009. There are 26 episodes of 24 minutes duration.

Overview
The series begins with personifications of two of the five elements, Raindrop (water) and Shao Yen (wood), training with their Master, Yun, in the ancient art of Chitaido. However the strongest leader in the Land of a Thousand Legends, General Bu, upsets the peaceful world by taking Yun to begin his attempt to capture the four elements after Flamo, the fire element, joins him voluntarily. General Bu does this to stop the elements joining together and defeating him. Master Raindrop and Shao Yen are soon joined by the other two elements: Jin Hou, the metal element (an anthropomorphic golden monkey), and Niwa, the earth element (a humanoid girl who appears to be made of clay). Together they attempt to rescue Master Yun and travel to the place where the golden dragon was defeated and restore him to power.

Cast
 Josh Anderson as Master Raindrop
 Jane U'Brien as Jin Hou, Red boy and various characters
 Rachel King as Niwa
 Sarah Aubrey as Shao Yen
 Josh Quong Tart as Flamo
 David Francis as Grub
 Brian Meegan as General Bu

Production
The series was produced by Big Communications, Flux Animation Studio, Flying Bark Productions, Media Development Authority, and Southern Star Entertainment. As well as individually by Brent Chambers, Vincent Lim, Geoff Watson and Yasmin McConville. Directed by Susan Oliver, Steve Cooper and Kevin Wotton. It was written by Paul Barber, Kym Goldsworthy, Lisa Hoppe, Brendan Luno, John Mein, Kitty Phipps, Gina Roncoli, James Walker, Anthony Watt, David Witt, Leonard Mah, James Meldrum, Joshua Chiang and Jeff Lawrence. Series one consisted of 26 episodes and was produced in 2008

Reception
The series has received mixed reviews. It has been accused of copying many of the martial arts and element-related themes in popular children's cartoons like Avatar: The Last Airbender, Xiaolin Showdown and Samurai Jack

International broadcasts

Episodes

References

External links
 Master Raindrop at IMDb

2008 Australian television series debuts
2000s Australian animated television series
Australian children's animated television series
Australian computer-animated television series
New Zealand children's animated television series
Singaporean animated television series
Seven Network original programming